Herbert Money (29 November 1899 – 9 January 1996) was an educator who was involved with the evangelical church in Peru and more broadly South America. He worked in Peru for 40 years of service and was known variously as 'The General' or 'The King'.

Biography

Early life 
Herbert Money, the eldest son of Edwin and Mary Money, was born in Queensland, Australia, on 29 November 1899. He moved with his family to Christchurch, New Zealand, in 1904. Money's parents had been officers in The Salvation Army and Herbert became a Christian early in his life. Around the age of eight he was enrolled as a junior soldier of The Salvation Army in the old barracks of The Salvation Army Christchurch City Corps. From about 1910, the Money family worshipped at Oxford Terrace Baptist Church. In 1918, the family moved yet again, to worship at Richmond Mission.

After a year as a day student at the Christchurch Technical College, Money left school at the age of 15 to contribute to the family income. He spent a couple of years with Turnbull and Jones, a firm of electrical engineers, and then joined the staff of T H Green's wholesale grocers where he remained till the end of 1919. He was determined to pursue a higher education and, while continuing with daytime employment, successfully compressed into a year of night study a year of full-time day tuition. In 1920, he matriculated and became a probation teacher at Christchurch East Primary School.

In 1921, Money entered Teachers' Training College and Canterbury University College. In 1924, he wrote the thesis for the MA degree. His mentor was Professor James Shelley, a man he much admired. The following year he gained diplomas in education and social science. From 1924 on he served on the staff of Christchurch Technical College until his departure for Peru in 1927.

Early influences
In 1926, the missionary statesman Dr John R Mott visited university colleges in New Zealand under the auspices of the Student Christian Movement seeking missionaries for the continent of Asia. As Money sought to go to South America, Dr Mott put him in touch with Dr John A Mackay. In 1917, Mackay, supported by the Free Church of Scotland, founded Colegio Anglo Peruano, a school for boys in Lima, Peru. In 1942, the school name was changed to Colegio San Andrés.

Money's interest in the South American continent was inspired by the testimonies of Frederick B Glass, whom he met in 1925, and of George Allan, a New Zealander and founder of the Bolivian Indian Mission, whom he met in 1926. Both wrote in Money's personal autograph album. Glass completed his words of encouragement with a quote from Carlyle: ‘Choose well, your choice is brief but eternal [is brief and yet endless]'. It was an apt quotation for a young man shortly to embark upon a lifetime of work in Peru. Mackay, who had by now been appointed by the YMCA to be secretary-at-large for South America, passed on Money's name to the Free Church of Scotland. The church was looking for someone with his qualifications, and since none could be found in Scotland he was offered a position on the staff of the college.

Early days in Peru

Netta Kemp
When Money arrived in Peru on 2 August 1927, he considered his chances of finding a life partner to be slim (his own words), but within a few days he was to meet Janet "Netta" Kemp, the only female teacher in Colegio Anglo Peruano. Within two months of their meeting the couple announced their betrothal. Reverend J Calvin Mackay celebrated their union on 11 January 1928 in Cajamarca. According to Spanish custom, she became known as Netta Kemp de Money. Herbert and Netta Money were made for each other. They were both strong and assertive, and they needed to be to balance each other. They were both fluent in Spanish. Each enjoyed a teaching ministry above all ministries. Perhaps their greatest unspoken disappointment was that they were unable to have children.

John Mackay
John Mackay, the founder of the college in 1917, had qualified for a doctorate in philosophy in 1918, the first Anglo-Saxon to do so from the University of San Marcos. Over the ensuing years six other members of the college staff followed his example. Mackay firmly believed that a missionary, particularly one engaged in educational work, should immerse himself in the life of the country and become as familiar as possible with its history, politics, sociology and culture. In the academic world of Peru a doctoral degree was expected of a person appointed to be the principal or vice-principal of a large school.

Peruvian qualifications
Money was determined to follow the example of Mackay. The bachelor's degree was, for most students, a prelude to law or medical studies. There was no master's degree. For a doctorate a subject could be chosen in the fields of history, letters or philosophy. The course required the study of a wide range of topics followed by the submission of a thesis in consultation with a professor.

Early in 1928, at the beginning of the academic year and within six months of arriving in Peru, Money had become sufficiently fluent in Spanish to matriculate and enrol as a doctoral student. His university studies spanned three academic years during which time he continued to either teach at the College or was laid low with tuberculosis. Money chose the sociology of Peruvian Amazonia as the subject for his doctoral thesis because he hoped to minister to the "Lowland Indians". 

Money presented his thesis in December 1930. However, the final and public examination of the candidate, which was required for the conference of a doctoral degree, was delayed due to  political events which had closed the university in October of that year. Only the President of Peru could authorise a degree ceremony while the university was closed. Money had become friends with his professors, and they encouraged him to present a petition to the President, which was ultimately accepted. The needed ceremony went forward, and Money was awarded the degree of Doctor of Philosophy with distinction.

Many of the friends he made of students in the college and in the university later became influential men and held high office in government.

Peruvian Evangelical Church
Money was one of the founders of Iglesia Evangelica Peruana (the Peruvian Evangelical Church). The church came into being in 1932 as a cooperative enterprise of the Evangelical Union of South America and the Christian Missionary Alliance. It was a self-governing, self-supporting and self-propagating body that brought together a diversity of missionaries of different denominations. Less than four years after his arrival in Peru, Money was chairman of the commission that wrote the first constitution of the church and enabled it to be legally recognised by the government.

Peruvian Bible Institute
The Instituto Biblico Peruano (Peruvian Bible Institute), was founded in 1933 as a co-operative venture under the joint auspices of the Evangelical Union of South America, the Christian Missionary Alliance and the Free Church of Scotland. Its purpose was to train believers for Christian service. Money supported the institute and helped create the curriculum. After a few years the Christian Missionary Alliance found it necessary to reduce its support and responsibility for the directorship of the Institute which was then assumed by a Board of Governors composed of Christian businessmen resident in Lima, Money being amongst their number. Money's contacts enabled the Institute to acquire valuable land for expansion in the face of strong opposition from the Roman Catholic Church. Through the years Money and his wife remained strong supporters of the Institute. From 1934 until 1968, when he left Peru, Money lectured on church history.

National Evangelical Council
Money’s sphere of influence quickly widened when he was invited in 1940 to become the first organising and executive secretary of the newly created National Evangelical Council. In this post he wielded considerable influence for the good of all evangelical churches. The Council welded together the evangelical forces in Peru into a co-operative fellowship for work and witness. He was largely responsible for the success of the organisation which became recognised by the authorities as representing missionaries of all evangelical denominations. His influential contacts made it possible to keep the doors open for missionaries to enter and return to the country. He gave himself without restraint to the development of member bodies, and without regard to denomination, and in time was granted a diplomatic pass which gave him access to many a restricted area where he could more readily attend to the needs of missionaries arriving or departing the country.

In 1947, on returning to New Zealand for their next furlough, the Richmond Mission, because of ideological differences, found it was unable to continue its generous support. The Moneys long-term view was to foster the development of the indigenous church, whereas the Mission believed the urgent need was to preach the gospel in all its simplicity, not to train others to teach, as they were 'now in the last days'. A second major difference of view related to the Moneys' work towards co-operation between evangelical churches. To Herbert Money, the need for conciliation became more and more apparent as the years passed.

New Zealand Fellowship of the Peruvian Bible Schools 
At this time a number of prominent New Zealand Christian men joined together to form the New Zealand Fellowship of the Peruvian Bible Schools. The relationship between the Fellowship and the Moneys was mutually satisfying, and continued until they returned to Christchurch in 1968, and indeed beyond until they were settled into their retirement home.

The Wycliffe Bible Translators came to Peru in 1946 and in 1956 the first students, literate in Spanish as well as their native tongue, graduated from a bilingual school. Money took the cream of the graduating class that year, all having made a profession of faith, and started planning for a Jungle Indian Bible School. Money brought together the elements required to make his vision a reality: Wycliffe Bible translators, Le Tourneau – the American builder of heavy machinery – and Dr Moro of the Swiss Indian Mission. The Bible Institute for Lowland Indians – Instituto Biblico Selvatico de Pucallpa – was situated in Peruvian Amazonia on the eastern side of the Andes. The school, under the leadership of Moro, opened in 1957. The following year, a permanent site was chosen in the vicinity of the Wycliffe base camp at Yarinacocha.

In time, there came an increasing demand for more advanced training and a growing need for a better-prepared ministry. To meet this need Money, then secretary of the Board of the Peruvian Bible Institute, was largely responsible for the creation of Lima Evangelical Seminary. In 1961, the board approved the project and the first students were admitted to the seminary the following year. Money held the position of vice-rector until he departed from Peru in 1968. Four years later the first group graduated with the degree of Bachelor of Theology.

Recognition 
Upon his departure from Peru, in 1968, the Government of Peru conferred upon Money the honour of Knight-Commander, Order of Magisterial Palms, in recognition of his 40 years of distinguished service in the field of education. This included the supervision of school certificate examinations for the University of Cambridge, the headship of the Colegio San Silvestre for girls upon the death of the headmistress, Miss Nellie Kufal, till the arrival of her successor from Britain, the organisation and inauguration of Markham College for boys and its headship pending the arrival of the titular headmaster, the founding of the Bible Institute for Lowland Indians in Amazonia and the creation of the Lima Evangelical Seminary.

In 1964, The Salvation Army awarded Money The Order of Distinguished Auxiliary Service for his significant contributions to the work of the Army. He is one of few New Zealanders so recognised. Money was a friend and adviser to several of the Army's leaders in Peru and was largely responsible for the formation of the Army's first advisory board, bringing together a body of influential Christian-minded people. Money was himself a member of the board when it was formed. His influential contacts assisted the Army commencing a prison brigade programme. He accompanied General Albert Orsborn on his visit to Peru and translated for him.

In 1984, Money was given an honorary Doctorate of Divinity from the Central School of Religion of Indiana. It was a singular honour in that he was neither an ordained minister nor trained for the ministry.

Money travelled widely in both North and South America and represented Peru at international conferences in the Netherlands, Switzerland and Germany. His commitment to the tasks appointed him was well illustrated when he visited Switzerland in 1968. On his way to Lausanne he took ill in West Hartlepool with urinary retention and had to undergo emergency surgery. Determined to fulfil his engagement in Switzerland, Money persuaded his medical advisers to let him go with an indwelling urinary catheter.

In 1968, at his retirement from San Andrés School, Money was asked what subjects he had taught. He replied: ‘Geography, music, art, handwork, history, psychology, logic, philosophy, religion and English’. When asked if any students stood out in his memory, he named a list of men holding the highest positions in Peruvian life, including a former cabinet minister with the nickname at school of ‘Sleepy Donkey’. Money had taught at the school from 1927 until his retirement, apart from a brief period between 1940 and 1942.

Post Retirement 
Money entered retirement in 1968 and settled in Christchurch. He was appointed general secretary of the Evangelical Alliance of New Zealand and, in 1972, elected president. The Adelphi Club gave him the opportunity to meet regularly with Christian businessmen. He attended Inter-Varsity Fellowship conferences and many conventions.

Until May 1992, Money travelled south each year to take part in the annual Waihola Christian Youth Camps. He did not see age as a bar to participating in the activities of youth. He looked forward to giving a lecture each year, and spent many hours in preparation. These camps helped him maintain his youth.

Money never forgot his beloved Peru and Spanish was for him a first language as much as English. After serving as President of the Christchurch Spanish Club for several years he was elected a life member of the Sociedad Hispanica. In this capacity he assisted many new immigrants particularly from Chile. His knowledge of the intricacies of law helped many through the mazes of legal formalities.

In his last years Money's greatest pleasure was to hear of the growth of the evangelical movement in Peru. He felt that the foundations for Christian education he had laid were now bearing fruit in abundance.

Additional Material 
Credentials as detailed by Dr Money
 M A, with 1st Class Honours in Education, University of N Z, 1925
 Dip Ed (Diploma in Education), University of N Z, 1926
 Dip Soc S (Diploma in Social Sciences), University of N Z, 1926
 Ph D, Sociology, Universidad Mayor de San Marcos, Peru, 1931
 Master, Colegio Anglo Peruano, Lima, Peru, 1927–1939
 Lecturer in Church History, Instituto Biblico Peruano, 1934–1968
 Vice Rector and Professor Historia del Cristianismo y Teologia Sistematica, Seminario Evangelico del Peru, 1940–1968
 Secretario Concilio Nacional Evangelico del Peru, 1940–1968
 Founder, Instituto Biblico Selvatico de Pucallpa, 1957
 Knight-Commander, Order of Magisterial Palms, official recognition by Government of Peru for 40 years of distinguished service in the field of education.
 Order of Distinguished Auxiliary Service (The Salvation Army)
 DD(Hon)

References

Bibliography
 H. Bramwell Cook, White Gujaratis, Published Bramwell Cook, Christchurch, 2007, 
 Margaret Kemp Melanson (editor), Memories of Peru, Unpublished, Christchurch, 1984
 John M. McPherson, At the Roots of a Nation: The story of San Andrés School in Lima, Peru. The Knox Press, Edinburgh, 1993
 Stewart McIntosh (editor), The Money Memoirs, New Zealand and Peru, 3 Vols. (1988)
 John Metzger, The Hand and the Road: the Life and Times of John Mackay, Westminster John Knox Press, Louisville, 2010

External links
 Princeton Theological Seminary
 Money's Creek

1899 births
1996 deaths
People from Christchurch
New Zealand educators
New Zealand evangelicals
Australian emigrants to New Zealand